Trophies named the Lamar Hunt Trophy are given to the winners of the following American football games:

AFC Championship Game in the National Football League
Border War (Kansas–Missouri rivalry) college football game

See also
Lamar Hunt U.S. Open Cup, the oldest national soccer tournament in the US